Michael Parker or Mike Parker may refer to:

In arts and media

Music
Michael Parker (musician), collaborator with Barb Jungr
Worldwide (rapper) (born 1986), American hip-hop musician, real name Michael Parker

Other media
Michael Barrymore (born 1952), British television personality and entertainer born Michael Parker
Mike Parker (reporter) (1943–2018), Chicago television reporter
Mike Parker (writer) (born 1967), British travel writer
Michael Parker (novelist) (born 1959), American novelist and short story writer
Mike Parker (typographer) (1929–2014), American typographer and type designer

Others
Michael Parker (politician) (born 1949), former U.S. congressman from Mississippi
Michael Parker (courtier) (1920–2001), private secretary to the Duke of Edinburgh, 1947–1957
Mike Parker (hurdler) (born 1938), British hurdler
Michael Parker (bishop) (1900–1980), bishop in the Church of England
Michael Parker (event organiser) (1941–2022), producer of military tattoos and large-scale events
Michael Parker (basketball) (born 1981), American-born Japanese basketball player
Mike Parker (American football) (born 1975), American football linebacker
Michael Parker (hurler) (1881–1958), Irish hurler
Michael Parker (headmaster), Australian educationalist

Characters
Mike Parker (EastEnders), a former character in the British soap opera EastEnders